This is a list of diplomatic missions in Senegal.  The capital, Dakar, currently hosts 80 embassies. A former French colony, Senegal is a regional power in western Africa.

This listing excludes honorary consulates.

Diplomatic missions in Dakar

Embassies

Other missions or delegations 
 (Delegation)

Gallery

Consular missions

Saint-Louis  
 (Consulate-General)

Ziguinchor  
 (Consulate-General)

Non-resident embassies accredited to Senegal

Resident in Abuja, Nigeria

Resident in Paris, France

Resident in Rabat, Morocco

Resident in other cities 

 (Accra)
 (London)
 (Madrid)
 (Abidjan)
 (Bamako)
 (London)
 (Addis Ababa)
 (Accra)
 (Stockholm)
 (Accra)
 (London)
 (Algiers)
 (Nouakchott)

Closed missions

References

 
Diplomatic missions
Senegal